Lindsay Peoples Wagner is an American editor. She is the former editor-in-chief of Teen Vogue, and was the youngest editor-in-chief of any Condé Nast magazine. She was named editor-in-chief of New York magazine's The Cut in 2021.

Life and career 
Peoples was raised in Brown Deer, Wisconsin. After attending Buena Vista University in Iowa, she started an internship at Teen Vogue. She later held an assistant position within the company. 

She left Teen Vogue to work for The Cut, an online style and culture publication of New York Magazine, as a fashion editor. During her time at The Cut, she wrote a "celebrated" article on what it is like to be black in fashion, interviewing 100 people in the business. In October 2018, she became editor-in-chief of Teen Vogue, making her the youngest, as well as the third African-American, editor-in-chief of a Condé Nast publication. 

In 2020 she founded the Black in Fashion Council with Sandrine Charles, an organization dedicated to holding the fashion industry accountable for change related to race and inclusion. The Black in Fashion Council garnered the support of approximately 400 Black models, stylists, executives, and editors and has 38 international partners.

In 2021, Peoples rejoined The Cut as its editor-in-chief, replacing Stella Bugbee.

Honors and awards 
 2017 – ASME, Next Award 
 2020 – Forbes 30 Under 30 (Media)

References

External links  
Lindsay Peoples on Instagram

Year of birth missing (living people)
Buena Vista University alumni
Condé Nast people
Fashion journalists
Living people
People from Milwaukee County, Wisconsin
21st-century African-American women
21st-century African-American people
American women editors
New York (magazine) people
African-American founders